Bergerville is an unincorporated community located within Howell Township in Monmouth County, New Jersey, United States. The area was originally developed as a resort bungalow community in the first half of the 20th century.

The settlement is centered on the intersection of U.S. Route 9 (which runs north and south), Bergerville Road (which runs west towards Freehold Township) and Casino Drive (which runs east towards the Manasquan Reservoir). Commercial businesses line US 9 through the area and some single-family houses are located along the two main east–west roads and Fort Plains Road. Numerous condominium and town house developments are also located nearby.

References

Neighborhoods in Howell Township, New Jersey
Unincorporated communities in Monmouth County, New Jersey
Unincorporated communities in New Jersey